Anthony William Vivian Loyd (born 12 September 1966) is an English journalist and noted war correspondent, best known for his 1999 book My War Gone By, I Miss It So. He gained prominence in February 2019 when he tracked down a British ISIL bride, Shamima Begum.

Biography
Loyd grew up in Churt on the Hampshire–Surrey border and attended St Edmund's School, Hindhead, Eton College, and the Royal Military Academy Sandhurst.

War correspondent
He went to school for journalism and then went to Bosnia with a vague plan to cover the ongoing war.  He started taking pictures but almost by accident an American reporter offered to buy some that he saw.  So Loyd became a war photographer supporting himself by selling photos for 50 Deutsche Marks per photograph. Much later Loyd was traveling taking photos with British forces around Travnik, central Bosnia and Herzegovina about 90 km west of Sarajevo. While covering a fire fight a French correspondent who was writing for The Daily Telegraph was wounded by a claymore mine set off by the Croat HVO forces. The wounded correspondent asked Loyd to fill in until the paper could send a replacement, Loyd agreed and so started his first job as a journalist. Afterwards he was put on retainer by The Times of London and regularly sent to war zones around the world.

Among the wars he reported were the conflicts in Bosnia, Kosovo, Chechnya, Afghanistan, Sierra Leone and Iraq. Loyd was noted for the risks he took in pursuing his stories.  His most recent bylines (as of 15 September 2005) have been from Baghdad, where he has been out on patrol with both the American and Iraqi forces.

Shamima Begum
Loyd found ISIL bride Shamima Begum in the Al-Hawl camp in Northern Syria. After finding Begum, Loyd taped an interview with her where she stated she had no regrets about moving to ISIL-Controlled territory.

Author
My War Gone By, I Miss It So, is a book based on his experiences in Bosnia and Chechnya. In the book Loyd staggers chapters about war in Bosnia, Chechnya, and boredom tinged with heroin addiction in London.

He published a second volume of autobiography, Another Bloody Love Letter, in 2007. It covered his experiences in the former Yugoslavia, Sierra Leone, Afghanistan and Iraq.

Personal life
Loyd married Lady Sophia Hamilton, daughter of James Hamilton, 5th Duke of Abercorn in 2002 at Baronscourt, the Duke's 5,500 acre (22 km²) ancestral estate, near Omagh, County Tyrone, Northern Ireland. They were divorced in 2005, on an amicable basis, occasioned by Loyd's frequent absences reporting on wars. He remarried again in 2007 and is now based in Devon with his wife, daughter and stepdaughter.

While reporting in Northern Syria (2014), he was shot twice in the leg by Syrian rebels to stop him running away.

Great-grandfather

His maternal great-grandfather was Lieutenant General Sir Adrian Carton de Wiart (1880–1963). His great-grandfather was not only a highly decorated British soldier, he was also one of the most wounded (eleven times, which included the loss of an eye and a hand).

Bibliography

References

Sources

External links 

 Anthony Loyd on The Times and The Sunday Times
 Anthony Loyd on the New Statesman

1966 births
Living people
British investigative journalists
British journalists
British war correspondents
Foreign correspondents in Africa
New Statesman people
People educated at Eton College
People educated at St Edmund's School, Hindhead
The Sunday Times people
The Times journalists
The Times people